Route 269 is a short highway in the Kansas City, Missouri area. The northern terminus is at Interstate 35 (I-35) in Kansas City; its southern terminus is at Front Street in Kansas City. The route has an interchange with Route 210 in North Kansas City. Chouteau Trafficway is a very narrow road for the amount of traffic it handles, so in the summer of 2011, all buildings located on Chouteau between NE Parvin Road and NE Winn Road were taken by eminent domain and razed in order to widen Route 269 into a four-lane boulevard.

Route description
Route 269 begins at an intersection with Front Street in Kansas City, Jackson County, heading northwest on four-lane undivided Chouteau Trafficway. The road passes through industrial areas, with a pair of ramps providing access to Levee Road. The route crosses the Missouri River and headed into North Kansas City in Clay County, where it has an interchange with Route 210. Past this interchange, Route 269 heads back into Kansas City and becomes a two-lane undivided road, passing businesses. The route continues north through residential and commercial areas before widening into a four-lane divided highway and coming to its northern terminus at an interchange with I-35. Chouteau Trafficway continues north of I-35 as an unnumbered road.

Major intersections

References

External links

Transportation in Jackson County, Missouri
Transportation in Clay County, Missouri